In August 2019, a water feature was installed in Vancouver, Washington's Waterfront Park, in the United States. The City of Vancouver has referred to the installation as the Columbia River Water Feature.

Description and history
Described as a "Columbia River interactive art installation", the $3.5 million project was designed by artist Larry Kirkland. It features a  stone and bronze structure called Headwaters (or sometimes the Headwaters Wall) which has a cast bronze bas relief map of the Columbia Basin on the east side. The opposite side has an "engraved stone with a topographical map of the Columbia's origins", down which water falls into a shallow wading pool. According to KOIN, "one-inch-deep 'river' flows 150 feet along a molded riverbed dotted with stacks of granite representing each of the Columbia's tributaries". In September, The Columbian reported on the "unsightly" white deposits left by water. The water feature is maintained by the Vancouver Parks and Recreation Department.

References

2019 establishments in Washington (state)
Buildings and structures in Vancouver, Washington
Outdoor sculptures in Vancouver, Washington